Marios Ogkmpoe (born 10 October 1994) is a Greek professional footballer who plays as a striker for Super League 2 club AEL.

Club career
Born in Athens, Ogkmpoe began playing youth football with Nea Ionia, making his senior club debut at the age of 15, playing in the Delta and later the Gamma Ethniki, the 4th and 3rd tier of the Greek football league system respectively. In the summer of 2015 he moved to Gamma Ethniki club Fostiras, before signing for OFI on a free transfer in the summer of 2016.

After spending one-and-a-half seasons with OFI, Ogkmpoe signed a short-term deal with Scottish Premiership side Hamilton Academical on 24 January 2018, making his debut that same day, in a league match against Heart of Midlothian.

In March 2020 he signed a contract extension with Hamilton until 2021. On 19 May 2021 it was announced that he would leave Hamilton at the end of the season, following the expiry of his contract.

In July 2021 he signed for AEL. He scored his first goal on 14 November 2021 on his debut league appearance against home rivals Apollon Larissa. On 11 December 2021, he scored two goals against Apollon Pontou, and on 29 December 2021 he scored his first hat-trick against Xanthi, reaching 6 league goals by the end of 2021.

Personal life
Ogkmpoe is of Nigerian heritage.

Career statistics

Notes

References

1994 births
Living people
Greek footballers
Greek people of Nigerian descent
A.O. Nea Ionia F.C. players
Fostiras F.C. players
OFI Crete F.C. players
Hamilton Academical F.C. players
Athlitiki Enosi Larissa F.C. players
Delta Ethniki players
Gamma Ethniki players
Football League (Greece) players
Scottish Professional Football League players
Association football forwards
Greek expatriate footballers
Greek expatriate sportspeople in Scotland
Expatriate footballers in Scotland
Footballers from Athens
Super League Greece 2 players